Zhipu Road station is a metro station on Line 6 of the Hangzhou Metro in China. It was opened on 29 April 2021. It is located in the Xihu District of Hangzhou.

References 

Coordinates on Wikidata
Railway stations in Zhejiang
Railway stations in China opened in 2021
Hangzhou Metro stations